Nandicoor (variously Nandikur or Nandikoor) is a village in Udupi district of Karnataka state in India. The Nandicoor village lies amidst paddy fields, coconut gardens and evergreen forests. Rare flora and fauna are found in these forests. This scenery has been lost due to setting up of coal based thermal electric power generating station. Nandikoor railway station has been constructed for unloading of wagons which bring coal to a thermal electricity plant. Padubidri is nearest town to this village.

Nandikoor railway station is nearby to this temple.

External links 
Nandikoor Shree Durga Temple
Nandikuru Village
Nandikur protest

Villages in Udupi district